Myopites inulaedyssentericae is a species of tephritid or fruit flies in the genus Myopites of the family Tephritidae.

Distribution
United Kingdom, France, Germany, Estonia, Central Europe, Spain, Italy, Balkans, Ukraine, North Africa.

References

Tephritinae
Myopites
Insects described in 1827
Diptera of Europe
Diptera of Africa